Jo Marchant is a freelance journalist specializing in science and history. After gaining a BSc in genetics from Leicester University and a PhD in microbiology she became a science writer, and is the author of Decoding the Heavens, an exploration of the history and significance of the Antikythera mechanism, The Shadow King: The Bizarre Afterlife of King Tut's Mummy and Cure: A Journey Into the Science of Mind Over Body(shortlisted for the Royal Society Insight Investment Science Book Prize 2016). A former editor of the science journal Nature and opinion editor at New Scientist magazine in London, she has written for The Guardian and The Economist.

Marchant writes that "the idea for Decoding the Heavens came about in November 2006, when I was an editor at the science journal Nature. A research paper was due to be published revealing the workings of a sophisticated ancient device called the Antikythera mechanism. The story grabbed me immediately, and I was desperate to find out more about this mysterious contraption. I travelled to Athens to see the remains of the mechanism, and to meet those who have studied it and hear their stories."

References

Living people
Year of birth missing (living people)
British science journalists
British women journalists
Women science writers